Frederick Yaw Ahenkwah is a Ghanaian politician and member of parliament for the Jaman North constituency in the Bono region of Ghana.

Early life and education 
Frederick was born on 24 June 1982 and hails from Sampa in the Bono region of Ghana. He had his SSSCE in 2000. He also had his Teacher certificate in Science and Technical in 2004. He further had his Degree in Agriculture Education in 2010.

Career 
Frederick was a form master in the Ghana Education Service.

Political career 
Frederick is a member of NDC and currently the MP for Jaman North Constituency. He won the parliamentary seat with 22,375 votes whilst the NPP parliamentary aspirant Siaka Stevens had 18,206 votes.

Committees 
Frederick is a member of the Privileges Committee and also a member of the Land and Forestry Committee.

Personal life 
Frederick is a Christian.

References 

Living people
National Democratic Congress (Ghana) politicians
1982 births
Ghanaian MPs 2021–2025